Giovanni Mossi (c. 1680 in Rome – 1742 in Rome) was an Italian baroque composer.

Life
Many of the details of his life appear to be lost. Mossi was active in Rome around 1700 and is grouped stylistically with the "Roman school" of the period, along with others such as Giuseppe Valentini. From what can be observed in his extant works, he appears to have been a skilled and innovative composer. He is most known for his collection of violin sonatas.

Selected works
 Op. 1: 12 sonate per violino, violone o clavicembalo (1716)
 Op. 2: 8 concerti a 3 e a 5 (c. 1720)
 Op. 3: 6 concerti a 6 (c. 1720)
 Op. 4: 12 concerti (1727)
 Op. 5: 12 sonate o sinfonie per violino e violoncello (1727)
 Op. 6: 12 sonate da camera per violino, violoncello o clavicembalo (1733)
 Minuetto in la maggiore

References

External links
 

1680s births
1742 deaths
Italian Baroque composers
Italian male classical composers
18th-century Italian composers
18th-century Italian male musicians